The Battle of Medenine ( [Operation Capri]) was an Axis spoiling attack at Medenine in Tunisia on 6 March 1943. The operation was intended to delay an attack by the British Eighth Army on the Mareth Line. The British had been forewarned by Ultra decrypts of German wireless communications and rushed reinforcements from Tripoli and Benghazi before the Axis attack, which was a costly failure. General Erwin Rommel, the commander of Army Group Africa , could not afford to lose forces needed for the defence of the Mareth Line and the effort was abandoned at dusk that day.

During the night, the Eighth Army remained alert for the possibility of another Axis attempt and sent forward patrols to carry out reconnaissance and to demolish knocked-out Axis tanks. On 7 March the Axis forces began a withdrawal northwards towards the Mareth Line, the Eighth Army pursuit being slowed by rain. The Battle of Medenine was the last battle commanded by Rommel in the North African Campaign, who returned to Europe for good soon afterwards.

Background

Axis retreat from El Alamein
The retreat of  took place from  1943 and on 8 November, Operation Torch began in Morocco, Algeria and Tunisia.

Rommel had wanted retreat to Wadi Akarit in the Gabès area,  further west, where the non-motorised troops could defend the narrow gap between the Mediterranean and the Chott Djerid. The tanks and motorised infantry could join the 5th Panzer Army (Colonel-General Hans-Jürgen von Arnim) further north, drive back the First Army from Tunisia into Algeria, then swiftly return to force back the Eighth Army, preparatory to embarkation for Europe. At a meeting with Hitler on 28 November, Rommel discussed the proposal but only received a promise of more supplies. On the night of  the British attacked and on the following evening the  resumed its retreat and despite the chronic fuel shortage, evaded another outflanking move. The  took up a defensive position at Buerat on 29 December but this was poorly fortified, wide open to an outflanking manoeuvre and vulnerable to being cut off by an attack on Gabès by the First Army from southern Tunisia. The supply situation was little better, with  tons of the  daily requirement being delivered and 95 percent of the fuel being used to distribute supplies or for withdrawals.

The Long Range Desert Group (LRDG) attacked Axis supply lines and hundreds of lorries were stranded along roads for lack of fuel, while the Eighth Army massed petrol and ammunition for its next attack. On 13 January 1943, the infantry of the 21st Panzer Division were sent north to the 5th Panzer Army, to guard against the loss of Gabès and on 15 January, the Eighth Army attacked with  against  and  tanks; in the evening Rommel ordered another withdrawal. Lack of fuel and apprehension about the threat to Gabès, led to the retreat passing beyond the Tarhuna–Homs line and Tripoli was occupied by the British on 23 January, the Axis retreat from El Alamein having covered . On 13 February, the last Axis soldiers left Libya and on 15 February, the rearguard reached the Mareth Line,  inside Tunisia.  intended the line to be held indefinitely but Rommel considered it too vulnerable to another flanking move, unlike the Wadi Akarit position, another  back.

Operation Torch

On 7 November 1942, Anglo-American troops landed in Morocco and Algeria, the British First Army (Lieutenant-General Kenneth Anderson) either side of Algiers and the US II Corps (Major-General Lloyd Fredendall) at Casablanca and Oran, against the resistance of Vichy French forces until an armistice on 10 November. On 14 November, the Allied forces tried to reach Tunis,  to the east through mountainous country by a coup de main assisted by parachute landings but poor weather, a rapid German build-up of  aircraft and the airlift of troops from Sicily to Tunisia under Case Anton ended the advance on 30 November. The Axis troops were able to form a bridgehead around the ports of Tunis and Bizerta and by December, about  troops, fifty Panzer IV and forty Tiger tanks had arrived. The 5th Panzer Army had been formed on 8 December and winter weather began in mid-month, which was further to the advantage of the Axis defenders, as  continued its retreat from El Alamein, towards southern Tunisia. Having stabilised the Axis position in Tunisia, the 5th Panzer Army undertook several local offensives in the new year, at the Battle of Sidi Bou Zid (14–17 February), the Battle of Kasserine Pass (19–24 February) and Operation Ochsenkopf (26 February – 4 March 1943).

Mareth Line

Southern Tunisia is a region of broken terrain, with rocky ridge lines and desert, which obstruct manoeuvre; opposite a bight where the north–south coast opens to the east, a semi-arid, scrub covered coastal plain is met inland by the Matmata Hills which run south to north. North of Gabès, the road to Sfax passes between the sea and the Chotts, the only route north for the Eighth Army. Across the plain in a line roughly south-west to north-east, lay the Mareth Line, a fortification built by the French in the 1930s. In the north, the hills and line of forts terminated at the Tebaga Gap, a low pass between the Matmata Hills and the Djebel Tebaga, another line of high ground to the west of the gap running east–west. North and west of this feature is the Chott el Djerid; west of the Matmata Hills, lies dry Jebel Dahar country and then the impassable sand of the Grand Erg Oriental. Gabès is on the coast where the plain meets the route from the Tebaga Gap.

The wadi crosses the coastal plain from Zarat to Toujane and into the Matmata Hills beyond. In 1938, the French judged Jebel Dahar to be impassable to motorised transport and had not extended the Mareth Line any further inland but 1943 motor vehicles had much better performance.

Prelude

Axis preparations

On 28 February, Rommel, Messe and the senior armoured unit commanders met to discuss an attack on Medenine, the junction of several roads and tracks. An attack from three directions was suggested, from Toujane to Metameur on the left, an attack in the centre and an attack on the right from the Hallouf Pass to Medenine. Rommel suggested an attack nearer the coast to create the possibility of attacking from an unexpected direction but the subordinates disagreed because of information from reconnaissance by the  that the coastal approaches were difficult, mined and covered by many guns. There was no room for manoeuvre and the tanks would be easy targets for British artillery and aircraft.

Axis plan

The DAK was to capture a line from Hir en Nraa to Ksar Rebounten and then circle north or north-east, the 10th Panzer Division advancing from the Hallouf valley to capture Metameur. The 21st Panzer Division was to emerge from the south end of Djebel Tebaga and attack towards Hir Ksar Koutine. The 15th Panzer Division was to move from Djebel er Remtsia towards Hir en Nraa followed by its infantry and the Reconnaissance units were to cut the Foum Tatahouine–Medenine road to prevent the movement of British reinforcements. Column Bari was to make a frontal attack at Zemlet el Lebene with Battle Group  on the right flank, Panzer Grenadier Regiment 200 in the centre and Battle Group  on the left.

British preparations
Long before the Eighth Army reached the port of Tripoli, thought had been given to an attack on the Mareth Line and the LRDG had been sent to survey the land south of the Matmata Hills. Despite maps and reports indicating that the ground was impossible for tanks and lorries, the LRDG found a route inland southwards and around the hills to the Tebaga Gap, between the Chott el Fejaj salt marsh and the hills. The 7th Armoured Division (Major-General George Erskine) had probed forward from Tripoli, while the 51st (Highland) Division (Major-General Douglas Wimberley) and the 2nd New Zealand Division (Major-General Bernard Freyberg) rested at the port. Winter rains turned the ground into a swamp, until a short lull beginning on 15 February, when the 7th Armoured and 51st (Highland) divisions moved forward and captured airfields at Medenine on 17 February. The next day the Free French Flying Column and the 1st Infantry Battalion Marine and Pacific arrived with General Philippe Leclerc, after a march across the Sand Sea from Lake Chad, to join the Eighth Army. XXX Corps (Lieutenant-General Oliver Leese) brought the 2nd New Zealand Division forward from Tripoli, which had the 8th Armoured Brigade and the 201st Guards Brigade under command.

The Allied code breakers of the Government Code and Cipher School at Bletchley Park in England, read Axis Enigma codes and on 25 February, warned Montgomery that Rommel had ordered the termination of the Battle of Kasserine Pass (19–24 February). On 28 February, they decrypted orders from Rommel for a reconnaissance to be conducted by the 1st Italian Army, preparatory to an attack on the Eighth Army by 4 March and a fuel return on 1 March showed that the Axis forces had sufficient for a three-day operation. Montgomery thought that XXX Corps at Medenine would not be able to withstand an attack before 7 March but over three days and nights, reinforcements were rushed forward and by 4 March,   guns and  guns had been moved up. The DAF had also increased the number of aircraft in the area to double that of the Axis air forces. At  on 6 March, Allied code breakers sent notice to Montgomery of the thrust line of the attack and that it was to begin at

Battle

6 March

Tanks of the 15th Panzer Division moved along the Toujane–Medenine road and then turned north against the positions of the 7th Armoured Division and were engaged by the anti-tank guns of the 131st Infantry Brigade and the 2nd Battalion Scots Guards. On the 2nd New Zealand Division front, the 164th Light  Division was engaged by Bren carriers of the 21st NZ Battalion, which met seven vehicles carrying infantry and anti-tank guns at close range in the fog. The New Zealanders inflicted many casualties, for the loss of two casualties and a carrier. Small parties of Axis infantry probed the front and as the fog dispersed, artillery was seen moving up. The British artillery did not reply, being under orders to wait until the attackers were in range of the maximum number of guns; the anti-tank guns were only to commence firing at short range. The 5th Field Regiment Royal Artillery (RA) did not begin to fire until Axis tanks were engaged by the forward six-pounders and then bombarded infantry and lorries following the tanks, isolating them.

At about  tanks were reported to be converging on Tadjera Kbir (Point 270) and the 28th NZ Battalion reported ten tanks and thirty trucks moving up the wadi to its right. The tanks reached a dummy minefield and then diverted towards rising ground, as had been intended. When the crews alighted, mortars, machine-guns and artillery joined in. The attackers were taken by surprise and disorganised but then spotted the anti-tank guns and returned fire. A 6-pounder was damaged and two men wounded but the rest kept firing until the other weapons commenced fire and the surviving tanks retired. Fifteen prisoners from the 10th Panzer Division, including the tank company commander, were taken.

The British artillery fired everywhere, especially on areas registered beforehand, as soon as Axis troops or vehicles moved into them. The leading tanks of the 21st Panzer Division crossed a skyline and were engaged, observers of the 201st Guards Brigade reporting that they "wandered rather vaguely". The 2nd New Zealand Division was not attacked again during the morning but much disorganised movement of tanks and transport was seen. It was realised that the main Axis effort was against Tadjera Kbir and further north.

A troop of captured  guns with Royal Artillery crews operated as anti-aircraft guns. On the 51st Highland Division and 7th Armoured Division fronts, the Axis attacks were more determined but had little success and Tadjera Kbir was never threatened. At   tanks and infantry were engaged by the New Zealand field artillery, after which there were no more attacks on the New Zealand front. At about  Rommel accepted a suggestion from Messe to end the attack, since it could not be continued without risking losses which would compromise the defence of the Mareth Line.

Two New Zealanders were killed and two wounded in a raid over the 4th Field Ambulance and Bf 109 was shot down by the 26th Battalion with a captured Breda machine-gun. As dusk fell, the attackers withdrew, a detachment of the King's Royal Rifle Corps and other units at Haddada having remained undisturbed, despite being isolated when the FFF Column on the right was forced back, during an Axis outflanking move. During the night of  XXX Corps patrols went out to find out if the attack would resume on 7 March, despite the Axis tank casualties, which as dark fell on 6 March, were already known to be  another attack unlikely. On the New Zealand Division front, vigilance was maintained in case of an outflanking move south of the defensive line and after dark the five tanks knocked out on the 28th Battalion front were demolished, along with the others disabled along the XXX Corps front. Some tanks of the Staffordshire Yeomanry were moved forward slightly in the New Zealand area but the night was quiet except for British artillery harassing fire until

Aftermath

Analysis

In 1978, Matthew Cooper wrote that had the Axis attacked the previous week, it might have found the Eighth Army unprepared, having attacked at short notice to divert attention from the British First Army during . The rapid preparations made to receive the Axis attack, enabled the Eighth Army easily to defeat the offensive and Rommel wrote that the failure to delay the British attack on the Mareth Line, caused "a great gloom" and that for the Axis to remain in Africa was suicide.

Casualties
The Germans claimed  tanks,  cars,  vehicles,  and anti-aircraft guns and  In 1966, Ian Playfair, the British official historian, called the Eighth Army losses trifling and recorded  mostly German and  tanks.

Subsequent operations
At dawn on 7 March, some groups of Axis transport were seen moving to the north and quickly drew out of range as they were engaged by artillery. On 10 March, some heights were still occupied and there was sporadic long-range artillery fire; Rommel left Africa the same day for the last time, leaving Arnim in command. The defeat had been so comprehensive that it caused the Germans to question their security and Montgomery was rebuked for not taking greater steps to hide the source of his information.

On 6 March, Montgomery wrote to General Sir Alan Brooke, the Chief of the Imperial General Staff (the professional head of the British Army):

Allied plans for the attack on the Mareth Line continued virtually undisturbed. On 17 March, the II US Corps began Operation Wop (sic), an attack towards Gafsa, the Eighth Army began the preliminary Operation Walk and Operation Canter and then began Operation Pugilist, the Battle of the Mareth Line on 19 March.

See also

 List of British military equipment of World War II
 List of French military equipment of World War II
 List of German military equipment of World War II
 List of Italian Army equipment in World War II
 North African campaign timeline
 List of World War II battles

Notes

Footnotes

References

Further reading

External links
 Queen's in the Middle East, Medenine

Conflicts in 1943
1943 in Tunisia
Tunisian campaign
Battles of World War II involving the United Kingdom
Battles of World War II involving New Zealand
Battles of World War II involving France
Battles of World War II involving Italy
Battles of World War II involving Germany
March 1943 events